= Manulangi Natua-Tua =

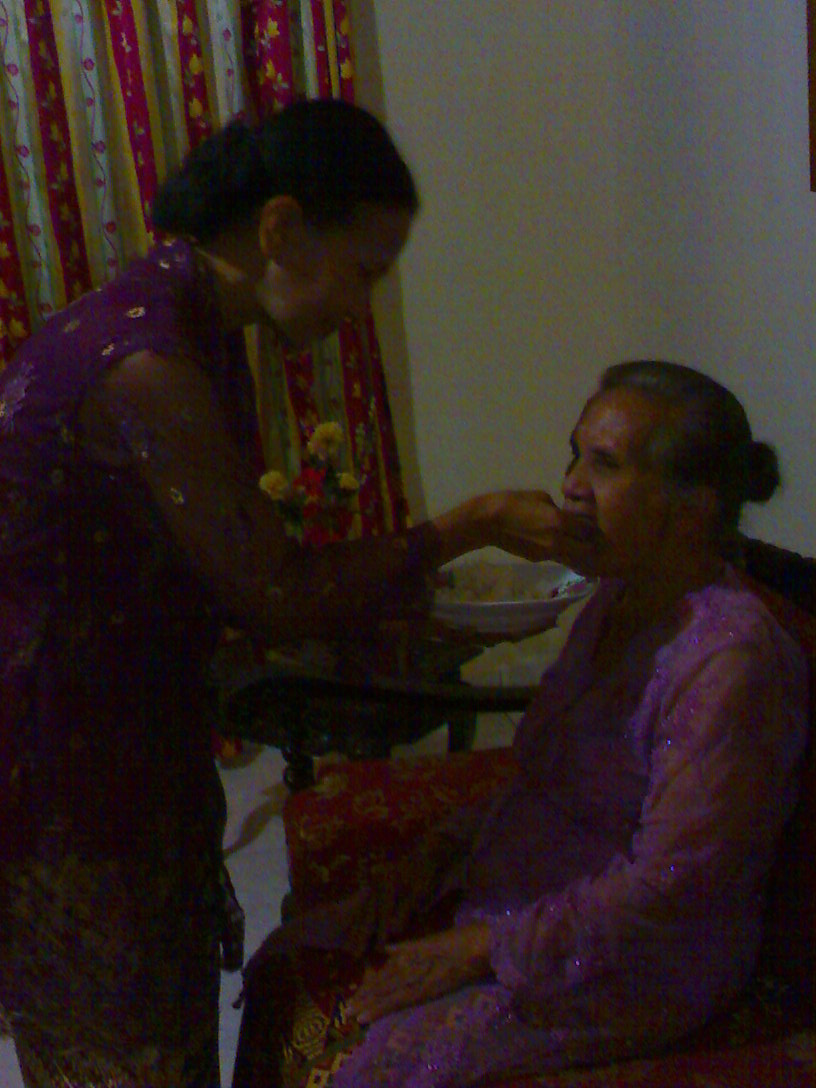
jmpl

Manulangi Natua-Tua is a traditional ceremony in Indonesian Batak society where children feed their parents. Manulangi Natua-Tua is made to parents when they are in old age or close to the death. This ceremony is made to parents who already have grandchildren and it is closely related to “feeding process" and also the food. Therefore, the availability of meat is a necessity in this ceremony. This ceremony can be performed if each child has agreed to do it. In this ceremony, each child and grandchild will feed their parent/grandparent. By performing this ceremony it is expected that the parents will get moral support in old age.
